Sandy Township is one of the twenty-two townships of Tuscarawas County, Ohio, United States.  The 2000 census found 3,354 people in the township, 2,513 of whom lived in the unincorporated portions of the township.

Geography
Located in the northeastern corner of the county, it borders the following townships:
Pike Township, Stark County - north
Sandy Township, Stark County - northeast corner
Rose Township, Carroll County - east
Warren Township - southeast
Fairfield Township - south
Lawrence Township - west

The village of Mineral City is located in central Sandy Township, and the unincorporated community of Sandyville lies in the northern part of the township.

Name and history
Statewide, the only other Sandy Township is located in Stark County.

Government
The township is governed by a three-member board of trustees, who are elected in November of odd-numbered years to a four-year term beginning on the following January 1. Two are elected in the year after the presidential election and one is elected in the year before it. There is also an elected township fiscal officer, who serves a four-year term beginning on April 1 of the year after the election, which is held in November of the year before the presidential election. Vacancies in the fiscal officership or on the board of trustees are filled by the remaining trustees.  The current trustees are Willard G Himes, Mike Spillman, and Angelo Pirolozzi, and the fiscal officer is Stacey Spillman.

References

External links
County website

Townships in Tuscarawas County, Ohio
Townships in Ohio